Pennington House may refer to:

Pennington House (Clarksville, Arkansas)
S.A. Pennington House, Elton, Louisiana
Pennington Cottage, Deer Park, Maryland
John Pennington–Henry Ford House, Macon, Michigan
Sarah Pennington House, Petoskey, Michigan
Governor John L. Pennington House, Yankton, South Dakota